Charles F. Crosby (December 12, 1847 – December 1, 1889) was an American politician and lawyer from Minnesota and Wisconsin.

Born in the town of Waterloo, in Jefferson County, Wisconsin, Crosby moved with his family to Dell Prairie, Wisconsin. He then moved to Minnesota in 1872.

Crosby served as state representative in Minnesota's 38th district. Crosby worked as a lawyer in Luverne, Minnesota. He was elected to Minnesota House of Representatives on November 3, 1874 and served Cottonwood, Jackson, Murray, Nobles, Pipestone, and Rock counties for one year. He was preceded by Nelson H. Manning and succeeded by William H. Mellen. Crosby was the chair of the towns and counties committee and served on the elections committee.

Crosby moved to Wausau, Wisconsin, where he practiced law. In 1881–1882, Crosby served in the Wisconsin State Senate and later served as a justice of the peace. He died in Wausau.

References

1847 births
1889 deaths
People from Waterloo, Wisconsin
Politicians from Wausau, Wisconsin
People from Luverne, Minnesota
Members of the Minnesota House of Representatives
Wisconsin state senators
Wisconsin state court judges
Minnesota lawyers
Wisconsin lawyers
19th-century American politicians
19th-century American judges
19th-century American lawyers